The 1970s was the first decade in the history of the video game industry. The 1970s saw the development of some of the earliest video games, chiefly in the arcade game industry, but also several for the earliest video game consoles and personal computers.

Notable games released in the 1970s included The Oregon Trail, Pong, Space Invaders, Asteroids, Galaxian, and Zork.

Arcade history

Notable early arcade video games of the early-to-mid-1970s include Computer Space (1971), Pong (1972), Space Race (1973), Speed Race (1974), Gun Fight (1975), Heavyweight Champ (1976), Fonz (1976), Night Driver (1976), Breakout (1976), Death Race (1976), and Space Wars (1977).

Golden age of arcade video games (1978–1979)

Classic arcade games of the late 1970s include Space Invaders (1978), Galaxian (1979), Asteroids (1979), Barrier (1979), Speed Freak (1979), Warrior (1979), Tail Gunner (1979), and Lunar Lander (1979).

Consoles of the 1970s

First-generation consoles (1972–1979) 

The so-called first generation of consoles were on sale between 1972 and 1980 and included the Magnavox Odyssey, Telstar, Home Pong, and Color TV-Game.

Typical characteristics of the first generation of consoles:
 Discrete transistor-based digital game logic.
 Games were native components of consoles rather than based on external or removable media.
 Entire game playfield occupies only one screen.
 Players and objects consist of very basic lines, dots or blocks.
 Colour graphics are basic (mostly black and white or other dichromatic combination; later games may display three or more colors).
 Either single-channel or no audio.
 Lacked features of second generation consoles, such as microprocessor logic, ROM cartridges, flip-screen playfields, sprite-based graphics, and multi-color graphics.

Second-generation consoles (1976–1983) 

The second generation of consoles, on sale between 1976 and 1988, made several leaps forward technologically. Consoles first available in the late 1970s included the Fairchild Channel F, Atari 2600, Bally Astrocade, and Magnavox Odyssey². The first handheld console, the Microvision, was released in 1979.

Typical characteristics of the second generation of consoles:
 Microprocessor-based game logic.
 AI simulation of computer-based opponents, allowing for single-player gaming.
 ROM cartridges for storing games, allowing any number of different games to be played on one console.
 Game playfields able to span multiple flip-screen areas.
 Blocky and simplistic-looking sprites, with a screen resolution of around 160 × 192 pixels.
 Basic color graphics, generally between 2-color (1-bit) and 16-color (4-bit).
 Up to three channel audio.
 Lacked features of third-generation consoles, such as scrolling tile-based playfields.

Notable video game franchises established in the 1970s

Arcade

Home computers and console 

Notes:
  Game franchises that also accompany major film or television franchises.

Financial performance

Best-selling arcade games of the decade 
The following titles were the best-selling arcade games of each year in the 1970s.

Best-selling home systems of the decade

Hardware timeline 
The following gallery highlights hardware used to predominantly play games throughout the 1980s.

References 

 
 
video games
Video games by decade